Amyris polymorpha is a species of flowering plant in the citrus family, Rutaceae, that is endemic to Cuba.

References

polymorpha
Plants described in 1925
Flora of Cuba
Vulnerable plants
Taxonomy articles created by Polbot